Central village may refer to:
Central Village, Connecticut
Central Village, Liverpool, a large redevelopment project in Liverpool, England